The German Film Award for Best Fiction Film is the main award given for best German film at the annual Deutscher Filmpreis awards, the German national film awards. It has been held annually since 1951 in varying formats. As the constitution said the prize was only awarded, if outstanding achievement was given, not every year a film was declared the winner of the prize. For the first three years, the Golden Candlestick was the highest honour for this category. It was then replaced by the Golden Bowl as a Challenge Prize, that would be passed to the winner of the next occasion, however as it was not given out for 17 years, the prize was abandoned for good in 1996. Regular prize winners receive a Film Award in Gold whereas the runners-up receive a silver award. A bronze award for the second runner-up was introduced in 2008. On some occasions, no film received the gold prize and a winner of the Silver Award was declared the best film of the year.

List of winning films

1951–1986
From 1951 to 1986 the prize was awarded by a commission which selected the best German feature film released in the previous 12 months.

1986–present

References

External links
German Film Awards at the Internet Movie Database

Fiction Film
Awards for best film
Awards established in 1951